Challwamayu (Quechua challwa fish, mayu river, "fish river", hispaniciced spelling Chalhuamayo) is a river in Peru located in the Junín Region, Satipo Province, Llaylla District.

References

Rivers of Peru
Rivers of Junín Region